The Useless Wooden Toys aka UWT are an Electro dance band from Cremona, created by Riccardo Terzi e Gilberto Girardi. They collaborated with Bugo, for whom they did the remixes of Plettrofolle, Piotta, Bassi Maestro, Cristina Donà, Il Genio, Amari, Dargen D'Amico, Ghemon Scienz and Mistaman. The name of the band is an homage to
the 2005 album of Jon Kennedy: Useless Wooden Toys.

Discography

Album
2008 – Dancegum (Virgin Records)
2011 – Piatto forte (Time Records)

Singole
2009 – Teen Drive In
2009 – Bomba
2009 – Fucking business
2011 – Il Tirannosauro
2012 – Pioverà benza

Notes

External links
Sito ufficiale
Scheda gruppo su sito EMI

Italian electronic music groups